Diane Ruggiero-Wright  is an American television writer and producer. Her credits include That's Life, Veronica Mars, Free Agents, Dirty Sexy Money, Big Shots, the Mythological X remake The Ex List and iZombie, which she co-created with Rob Thomas. With Thomas, she also co-wrote the script for the Veronica Mars film.

Ruggiero is a native of Old Bridge Township, New Jersey. While she was living in North Arlington, New Jersey, Ruggiero's writing talent was discovered by Mark St. Germain while she worked as a waitress at the Park and Orchard restaurant in East Rutherford, New Jersey. She is close friends with Jed Seidel and Rob Thomas.

References

External links

 

American soap opera writers
American women television producers
Living people
People from North Arlington, New Jersey
People from Old Bridge Township, New Jersey
American women television writers
Women soap opera writers
1969 births
Screenwriters from New Jersey
Television producers from New Jersey
21st-century American women